The following highways are numbered 851:

United States